Barbra O'Neil Chrisley (December 16, 1931 – May 18, 2013) was a Major League Baseball outfielder who played from 1957 to 1961 with the Washington Senators, Detroit Tigers and Milwaukee Braves. He was a native of Calhoun Falls, South Carolina, where he graduated from high school. He attended Newberry College.

Career 
Chrisley was originally signed by the Boston Red Sox as a free agent in 1950. On November 8, 1955, he was traded with minor leaguer Al Curtis, Dick Brodowski, Tex Clevenger and Karl Olson to the Senators for Mickey Vernon, Bob Porterfield, Johnny Schmitz and Tom Umphlett.

Chrisley started his major league career at the age of 25 on April 15, 1957 against the Baltimore Orioles as a pinch hitter for Camilo Pascual in the 11th inning. He singled off pitcher Billy Loes, but Pedro Ramos pinch ran for him. Chrisley was mostly used as a pinch hitter and bench player throughout his career, which consisted of 302 games, hitting .210 in 619 career at-bats. He hit 16 home runs, walked 55 times and struck out 62 times. Defensively, he only appeared in three games at positions other than an outfielder. In 1958 he was used in one game as a third baseman, and in 1960 he was used in two games as a second baseman. Chrisley played his final game on September 24, 1961.  Following the 1961 season he was sold to the newly-organized New York Mets, but he was returned to the Braves' organization without ever playing for the Mets, although a 1962 Topps baseball card was produced.

Post career 
At one point after his retirement from baseball, Chrisley worked as an insurance agent in Greenwood, South Carolina.

Other information
Chrisley hit 60 home runs in his final three minor league seasons, as well as posted a .343 average with the Indianapolis Indians in 1957.
He collected his first home run off Bob Turley on May 9, 1958. He hit his final two homers off Johnny Kucks on May 14, 1960.
His uniform numbers: 20 (1957), 34 (1957), 32 (1958), 24 (1959–1960), 30 (1961)
Bill Monbouquette pitched a one-hitter against the Tigers in a game in 1960, with the only Tigers hit being a double by Chrisley.

Other transactions
On December 6, 1958, he was traded by the Senators with Rocky Bridges and Eddie Yost to the Tigers for Reno Bertoia, Ron Samford and Jim Delsing.
On December 7, 1960, he was traded by the Tigers with Frank Bolling to the Braves for Bill Bruton, Terry Fox, Dick Brown and Chuck Cottier.

References

External links

1931 births
2013 deaths
Albany Senators players
Baseball players from South Carolina
Detroit Tigers players
Greensboro Patriots players
High Point-Thomasville Hi-Toms players
Indianapolis Indians players
Jacksonville Suns players
Kinston Eagles players
Louisville Colonels (minor league) players
Major League Baseball outfielders
Milwaukee Braves players
Nashville Vols players
People from Calhoun Falls, South Carolina
People from Greenwood, South Carolina
Roanoke Red Sox players
Roanoke Ro-Sox players
Syracuse Chiefs players
Toronto Maple Leafs (International League) players
Washington Senators (1901–1960) players